Robert Nash Ogden Jr (May 5, 1839 – April 16, 1905) was an author, Confederate lieutenant colonel, judge, orator, poet, lawyer and Speaker of the Louisiana House of Representatives.

Robert Nash Ogden Jr was born in Baton Rouge, Louisiana on May 5, 1839, to Robert Nash Ogden and Frances Sophia Nicholson. He attended the University of North Carolina for two and a half years. He studied law under Frederick Nash at Hillsboro, North Carolina. During the American Civil War he served under Brigadier General James Patrick Major for the Confederate Army with the rank of lieutenant colonel. When the war was over he returned to Louisiana and entered politics. After having been elected to the State Legislature, he served as Speaker of the House of Representatives (1880–1884). Then he went on to serve on the Louisiana Court of Appeals in New Orleans for two terms. Ogden was known for his skills as an orator as well as devoting his time to writing works of literature such as Who did it? - A novel(1870) Dreams of the past! and The Light of Thine Eyes.

He is the father of author Edith Ogden Harrison and the father-in-law of Chicago mayor, Carter Harrison Jr.

References

External links
 

 

1839 births
1905 deaths
Speakers of the Louisiana House of Representatives
Members of the Louisiana House of Representatives
Louisiana lawyers
Confederate States Army officers
19th-century American politicians